Aung Kyaw Htwe (born 22 December 1994) is a footballer from Burma. He plays for Magwe F.C. and Myanmar national football team.

References

1994 births
Living people
Burmese footballers
Myanmar international footballers
Association football forwards
Magway FC players